René Trabelsi (born 14 December 1962) is originally from Djerba, is a businessman and Tunisian politician, also having French nationality.

Early career
He did his secondary studies in Djerba and then went to France to continue his studies in management in 1985, at a time when Jews were particularly threatened: one of his nephews aged 5 died in an anti-Semitic shooting in Djerba. Having dual French and Tunisian nationality, he first manages franchise Franprix supermarkets in Ile-de-France before embarking on tourism. In the 1990s, he founded the tour operator Royal First Travel which specializes in Tunisia.

He is also a member of the Ghriba Pilgrimage Commission, manages a four-star hotel in Djerba for ten years and is involved in the Tunisian Hotel Federation.

Political career 
In 2011, he joined a liberal political party by the name of the Party of the Future.

On 5 November 2018, during a cabinet reshuffle, the head of the Tunisian government, Youssef Chahed, appointed him to head the Ministry of Tourism to replace Selma Elloumi. The appointment of a Jewish minister is a first since 1957 and the nominations of Albert Bessis and André Barouch. It is the end of 2018 the only Arab country to count a Jewish minister.

His appointment created a controversy and protests occurred in the days following it. Hundreds of demonstrators denounce the supposed "pro-Zionist positions" of René Trablesi. The Tunisian Minority Support Association denounces a campaign of defamation against the new minister.

His appointment was, however, welcomed by Tunisian actors and specialists in tourism, who appreciate the arrival of a professional in the sector. On 12 November, MPs put their trust in all the proposed ministers, including Trabelsi, who won 127 votes to 25 and one abstention.

In January 2019, Trabelsi faced another controversy when rumors accused him of giving a television interview to I24news, an Israeli channel, during which he allegedly discussed the Palestinian situation and the possibility of normalization with Israel. He denied this information that the interview, conducted at the request of the Palestinian ambassador in Tunis, was conducted by a Tunisian team for SCOPAL, a British information platform.

Since September 2019, Trabelsi represented Tunisia on the Executive Board of the World Tourism Organization.

On November 8, 2019 Trabelsi was named interim Minister of Transport.

On January 2, 2020 incoming head of government Habib Jemli intended to keep Trabelsi in his position as Minister of Tourism. However, the Jemli government was unable to gain the confidence of the Assembly of People's Representatives and Trabelsi was replaced by Mohamed Ali Toumi.

Private life
René Trabelsi is the son of Perez Trabelsi, chairman of the Jewish Ghriba Committee and leader of the Jewish community in Djerba.

A father of three children, he divides his time between Paris, Djerba and Tunis.

During the COVID-19 pandemic, Trabelsi tested positive for the virus and was hospitalized in intensive care in Paris. Trabelsi was released from the hospital on May 27, 2020.

References

1962 births
Living people
Tunisian businesspeople
Government ministers of Tunisia
People from Djerba
Jewish Tunisian politicians
Sephardi politicians